John Hart Crenshaw (November 19, 1797 – December 4, 1871) was an American landowner, salt maker, kidnapper and slave trader, based out of Gallatin County, Illinois.

He is also the great-great grandfather of killer and suspected serial killer Joe Ball, also known as "The Alligator Man".

Slave trader 
Although Illinois was a free state, Crenshaw leased the salt works in nearby Equality, Illinois from the government, which permitted the use of slaves for the arduous labor of hauling and boiling brackish water to produce salt. Crenshaw was widely believed to be involved in the kidnapping and sale of free black citizens in free states as slaves in the south, an enormously profitable trade later known as the Reverse Underground Railroad. Crenshaw was twice prosecuted for kidnapping, but never convicted.

Due to Crenshaw's keeping slaves and kidnapping free blacks, who were then pressed into slavery, his house became popularly known as The Old Slave House and is alleged to be haunted. Stories of strange noises upstairs, coming from victims, date to 1851. Despite accounts that the rooms were slave quarters, Crenshaw family stories indicate a distinction between the plantation's household servants and field hands, and the victims of Crenshaw's criminal activities.

A grand jury indicted Crenshaw for kidnapping, once in the mid-1820s (the outcome unknown) and again in 1842 when a trial jury acquitted him. The case's victims, Maria Adams and her seven or eight children ended up as slaves in Texas. In 1828, Crenshaw took Frank Granger and 15 others downriver to Tipton County, Tennessee, and sold them as slaves. Crenshaw also kidnapped 'Lucinda' and her children in 1828. She ended up in Barren County, Kentucky. Contemporary letters identify Crenshaw's role back both cases. Crenshaw also kidnapped Peter White and three others in the 1840s. They were sold into slavery in Arkansas, but were later rescued.

Underground Railroad National Network to Freedom
In 2004, the National Park Service named the Crenshaw Mansion, referred to as "The Old Slave House", as part of the Underground Railroad Network to Freedom program to acknowledge its importance in the "reverse underground railroad" and the role John Crenshaw played in condemning free blacks to slavery for profit.

See also
Patty Cannon
James Ford (pirate)
Delphine LaLaurie
La Quintrala
John A. Murrell
Solomon Northup
Gilles de Rais
Reverse Underground Railroad
Darya Nikolayevna Saltykova
Underground Railroad

References

Further reading 

Berry, Daina Ramey. The Price for Their Pound of Flesh: The Value of the Enslaved from Womb to Grave in the Building of a Nation.  Boston, MA:  Beacon Press, 2017.
McFarland, Joe. "When Salt was Gold - Illinois DNR", Outdoor Illinois, October 2009. Springfield, IL:  Illinois Department of Natural Resources.
Musgrave, Jon. Black Kidnappings in the Wabash and Ohio Valleys of Illinois.  Research paper presented at Dr. John Y. Simon's Seminar in Illinois History at Southern Illinois University at Carbondale, April–May 1997, Carbondale, IL.
Musgrave, Jon. Potts Hill Gang, Sturdivant Gang, and Ford's Ferry Gang Rogue's Gallery, Hardin County in IllinoisGenWeb.  Springfield, IL:  The Illinois Gen Web Project, 2018.
Myers, Jacob W. "History of the Gallatin County Salines”, October 1921-January 1922, Journal of the Illinois State Historical Society, 14:3-4.

External links
A timeline of the Crenshaw House (pdf)
Black Kidnappings in the Wabash and Ohio Valleys of Illinois by Jon Musgrave

This article includes public domain text from the National Park Service website

1797 births
1871 deaths
19th-century American businesspeople
American slave traders
History of Illinois
People acquitted of kidnapping
People from Gallatin County, Illinois